Zeb vs. Paprika is a 1924 silent comedy film starring Stan Laurel.  The film is a parody of the classic horse racing event on October 20, 1923, between American Kentucky Derby winner Zev and British Derby winner Papyrus, which attracted a crowd estimated at close to 50,000 people. It appears Dippy Donawho, Stan Laurel's character, wins a race against his American rival – until the two men learn they were riding each other's horses.

Cast
 Stan Laurel as Dippy Donawho
 James Finlayson as His trainer
 Ena Gregory
 George Rowe as Rival jockey
 Eddie Baker as Stable hand
 Jack Ackroyd
 Mildred Booth
 Sammy Brooks
 Billy Engle
 Al Forbes
 Dick Gilbert
 William Gillespie
 Helen Gilmore
 Charlie Hall
 Fred Karno Jr.
 Charles Lloyd
 Earl Mohan
 John B. O'Brien
 Al Ochs
 Harry L. Rattenberry
 Noah Young

References

External links

1924 films
1924 comedy films
1924 short films
1920s parody films
American silent short films
American black-and-white films
American parody films
Films directed by Ralph Ceder
American comedy short films
1920s American films
Silent American comedy films